Charles Gookin (c. 1660–c. 1723) was a deputy governor of colonial Pennsylvania.

Biography
Gookin had been a soldier and bore the title of colonel. He was appointed deputy governor of Pennsylvania by William Penn, serving from 1 February 1709 till 31 May 1717. He was selected because of his thoughtful demeanor and supposed wisdom, but the Pennsylvania Gazette frequently painted the man as deranged ostensibly because of the editor's daughter being rejected for a marriage proposal. Until the session of 1714, harmony prevailed between the assembly and the governor, but the remainder of his term of office was stormy. On 15 February 1714, the day for the convening of the assembly, the weather was severe, and a quorum failed to assemble. This embittered him, and when, on the following day, an organization was effected, he roundly abused the committee sent to him, and drove them from his door. He once removed all the chief justices of New Castle County for doing their duty in an action against his brother-in-law, leaving the county without a magistrate for six weeks. At another time, when the judges of the Supreme Court at New Castle refused to permit a certain commission of his to be published in court, he sent for one of the judges and kicked him. These events had upset many citizens in the areas under Gookin's jurisdiction. Lawyer Andrew Hamilton was indicted before the Governor's Grand Jury for cursing and arguing against Gookin. The case would later be dismissed. The breach made by his eccentricities widened until 1717, when, on petition of the council, he was removed. One of Penn's letters says: "His grandfather, Sir Vincent Gookin, had been an early great planter in Ireland in Kings James I. and Charles I. days."

Notes

References

1660s births
1720s deaths
Politicians from Philadelphia
Colonial governors of Pennsylvania